Ngao is a settlement in Kenya's Coast Province.

In the language of the Pokomo people "Ngao" means "shield"; this carries the same meaning in Kiswahili and probably in majority of the Miji Kenda tribes of the Kenyan Coast.

On the east side of Ngao is the Tana River that flows northward to the south. Lake Shakababo is located on the east side of the village that extends parallel with the riverside. They both place the village in the middle. May be this could be the reason for his name "Ngao"

There was an irrigation scheme across the river Tana. Some years back, the people of Ngao used to grow rice, maize, beans and other crops, There was so much banana plantations here.....the people were self-dependent in terms of food security.

References 

Populated places in Coast Province